An uncle is usually defined as a male relative who is a sibling of a parent or married to a sibling of a parent. Uncles who are related by birth are second-degree relatives. The female counterpart of an uncle is an aunt, and the reciprocal relationship is that of a nephew or niece.

In some cultures and families,  children may refer to the cousins of their parents as uncle (or aunt). It is also used as a title of respect for older relatives, neighbours, acquaintances, family friends, and even total strangers in some cultures, for example Aboriginal Australian elders. Using the term in this way is a form of fictive kinship.

Any social institution where a special relationship exists between a man and his sisters' children is known as an avunculate (or avunculism or avuncularism).  This relationship can be formal or informal, depending on the society. Early anthropological research focused on the association between the avunculate and matrilineal descent, while later research has expanded to consider the avunculate in general society.

Additional terms

 A half-uncle is the half-brother of one's parent. 
 A maternal uncle is the brother of one's mother.
 A paternal uncle is the brother of one's father.
 Uncle-in-law can refer to the husband of one's aunt or uncle, or the uncle of one's spouse.
 A great-uncle/granduncle/grand-uncle is the brother of one's grandparent.

Genetics and Consanguinity
Uncles by birth (brother of a parent) are related to their nieces and nephews by 25%. 
As half-uncles are related through half brothers, they are related by 12.5%. 
Non consanguineous uncles (male spouse of a relative) are not related by blood.

Cultural variations

Arabic 

In Arabic, one's mother's brother is called Khal خال and the mother's sister is called Khalah  خالة. On the father's side, one's father's brother is called Amm عم and the father's sister is called Ammah عمّة.

Turkish 
In Turkish, one's mother's brother is called dayi, father's brother is  amca, and aunt's husband is known as enişte. One's mother's sister is called "teyze". Father's sister is "hala". Uncle's wife is "yenge".

Albanian, Slavic, and Persian 
In some cultures, like Albanian, Slavic, or Persian, no single inclusive term describing both a person's kinship to their parental male sibling or parental male in-law exists. Instead, there are specific terms describing a person's kinship to their mother's brother (dajë in Albanian, daiyee in Persian, wuj (diminutive: wujek) in Polish) or a person's kinship to their father's brother (xhajë in Albanian, amou in Persian, stryj (diminutive: stryjek) in Polish). An analogous differentiation exists using separate terms to describe a person's kinship to their mother's female sibling (teze in Albanian, khaleh in Persian, ciotka (diminutive: ciocia) in Polish), and a person's kinship to their father's female sibling, (hallë in Albanian, ammeh in Persian, stryjna (diminutive: stryjenka) in Polish).

Furthermore, in Persian culture the terms used to describe a person's kinship to their maternal or paternal in-laws bear clear and unambiguous descriptions of that relationship, differentiating the parental in-laws from blood-relatives. For example, there is a specific term describing a person's kinship to the spouse of their paternal uncle (i.e. zan-amou, literally 'wife-of-' amou). This clarifies that kinship is to the spouse of the person's paternal male sibling, as opposed to a blood-relationship.

Indigenous Australians 
Many Australian Aboriginal and Torres Strait Islander peoples address male respected senior members of the community, known as Elders, as "uncle" (and women as "aunty") as a mark of seniority and respect, whether related or not, such as Uncle Archie (Roach) and Uncle Jack Charles.

South Asian 
In India, unambiguous names are used for various uncles such as one's father's brother chacha (or kaka). If the brother of one's father is older than one's father then he is called Tauji (or taya or bapuji). One's mother's brother is called Mama. A paternal aunt's husband is called Fufa (or Fuva) and a maternal aunt's husband is called Mausa (or Masa) in Hindi (or Gujarati).

Likewise, in neighbouring Bangladesh (and Pakistan), mother's brother is also Mama (or Mamu) as well father's brother as Chacha. A paternal aunt's husband is Phupha and maternal aunt's husband is Khalu.

Uncles in popular culture

Due to the loving image of an old but wise and friendly uncle in many cultures the word has been used as a loving nickname for many people. In Tibetan mythology Akhu Tönpa (Uncle Tompa) is a familiar and well-beloved figure. The American national personification Uncle Sam serves as an allegorical fatherly figure to many Americans. Various children's TV hosts have used uncle as their nickname, including Walt Disney (Uncle Walt), Bob Davidse (Nonkel Bob, literally Uncle Bob), Edwin Rutten (who hosted a children's show named De Show van Ome Willem (The Show of Uncle Willem). The Dutch poet Ome Ko also used uncle as part of his pseudonym.

Rich, wise or otherwise eccentric uncles are also popular in works of fiction.

Fictional uncles in comics
 Nonkel Fillemon in Urbanus.
 Nonkel Vital in De Kiekeboes.
 Ome Arie, character in Sjors en Sjimmie.
 Oncle Paul, the title character in a Belgian comics series.
 Ben Parker,  Uncle Ben, the uncle of Spider-Man.
 Scrooge McDuck, a.k.a. Uncle Scrooge from the Donald Duck comics.
 Uncle Choi by Hui Guan-man.
 Uncle Phil in Mickey Finn.

Fictional uncles in novels
 Uncle Oswald by Roald Dahl.
 Uncle Remus by Joel Chandler Harris.
 Uncle Tom by Harriet Beecher Stowe.
 Uncle Vanya by Anton Chekhov.
 Uncle Wiggily by Howard R. Garis.
 Vernon Dursley a.k.a. "Uncle Vernon" The uncle by marriage of the protagonist of Harry Potter by J. K. Rowling

Fictional uncles in films
 Uncle Buck, played by John Candy in the 1989 eponymous film.
 Uncle Fucker, character and song in South Park: Bigger, Longer & Uncut.

Fictional uncles in TV series
 Benjen Stark, in the television series Game of Thrones, referred to as "Uncle Benjen" by his nephew Jon Snow.
 Corrado "Junior" Soprano, in the television series The Sopranos, referred to as "Uncle June" by his nephew Tony Soprano.
 Jesse Katsopolis, in the television series Full House and Fuller House, referred to as "Uncle Jesse" by his three nieces DJ, Stephanie, and Michelle Tanner.
 Uncle Phil, a character in The Fresh Prince of Bel-Air.
 Charles O'Casey, also known as "Uncle Charley", a character in My Three Sons.
 Uncle Deadly, a character in The Muppet Show.
 Uncle Fester, a character in The Addams Family.
 Uncle Grandpa, a character in the eponymous TV series.
Uncle Iroh, a character from Avatar: The Last Airbender and The Legend of Korra; the Uncle of Princess Azula and Prince (later Fire Lord) Zuko, and brother of the main antagonist, Fire Lord Ozai.
 Uncle Jack, title character in a BBC children's TV series.
 Uncle Max, a character in the eponymous TV series.
 Uncle Ruckus, a character in the television series The Boondocks. No relation.
 Grunkle Stan, a character in the television series Gravity Falls. The great-uncle of the main characters.
 Uncle Arthur, a character in Bewitched.
Emperor Cloyd  and Becky the Enchantress characters of Disenchantment, siblings of Dagmar, maternal uncles of Bean and grandsons to the late Queen Mariabeanie.

Fictional uncles in advertising
 Uncle Arthur, mascot of a Guinness stout.
 Uncle Ben, mascot of a rice brand.

Fictional uncles in music
 Uncle Albert/Admiral Halsey, a 1971 a song by Paul and Linda McCartney from the album Ram.

See also 
 Bob's your uncle
 Say Uncle

References

External links
 
 
 

Kinship and descent
Family

es:Anexo:Nomenclatura de parentesco en español#Tíos